Mumbai Indians (MI) are a franchise cricket team based in Mumbai, India, which plays in the Indian Premier League (IPL). They were one of the nine teams that took part in the 2013 Indian Premier League. They were captained by former Australian captain Ricky Ponting during the initial stages of the IPL, but he was later replaced by Rohit Sharma.

Mumbai Indians beat the Chennai Super Kings at the 2013 Indian Premier League Final to win their first IPL title. They also emerged victorious at the 2013 Champions League Twenty20, which was their second CLT20 title. This was the last season Sachin Tendulkar played for the side.

.

Squad
 Players with international caps before the start of 2013 IPL are listed in bold.
  denotes players part of the 2013 CLT20 squad.

Indian Premier League

Season standings

Match log

Champions League Twenty20

Group standings

Match log

References

2013 Indian Premier League
Mumbai Indians seasons